Jan Bechtum (born 15 June 1958, Spijkenisse) is a Dutch guitarist and composer.

Bechtum was the first lead guitarist of Picture. He was influenced by Deep Purple, (mainly Ritchie Blackmore), Yes and Genesis.

In 1979 after having played in a few local bands, he got involved with Picture and was responsible for writing most of the songs for their first three albums. He left the band for personal reasons in 1983, right after their tour in Israel.

In 1992 and 1993, he performed in the gospel rock band Changed where he played with drummer Mark Maas. When that band stopped in 1993, Bechtum and Maas decided to try something and reformed Picture. With bass player Johannes Adema and vocalist Michel Zandbergen, the band recorded a demo and did a few good shows in the Netherlands. However, Bechtum decided to quit playing live performances in 1997 because of the growing violence in the Dutch nightlife.

Bechtum's favourite guitar is a Music Man Silhouette. While with Picture, he plugged straight into a Marshall with no effects.

In late 2007, Bechtum and the original members of Picture, with Ronald van Prooijen, teamed up for a reunion rehearsal. It went so well that they decided to continue rehearsing for some concert dates, and considered recording a new album in early 2008 with Shmoulik Avigal from the Diamond Dreamer lineup as their singer.

As of mid-2008, a permanent lineup was established with Bechtum, Rinus Vreugdenhil, Laurens Bakker, Rob vanEnkhuizen, and Pete Lovell. They are currently playing throughout Europe to very enthusiastic crowds. A limited edition live album was recorded at various venues and was released by the band. Plans are to go into the studio in early 2009 to record a new CD with new songs, two of which appeared on the limited edition CD.

The album Old Dogs, New Tricks was released on October 1, 2009 on the MarsMountains label. It contains 12 songs of all new material, released 30 years from when the band first formed.

On December 18, 2009, Bechtum announced his departure from Picture. He is being replaced by Peter Bourbon.

In October 2010, Bechtum revealed he formed a new band, Diamond Dreamer (named after the classic 1982 album), with former Picture member Rob van Enkhuizen (g), and also singer Martin van der Meyde, bassist Sander "Odie" Op Den Kelder and Nop Ton (dr).

When asked by the co-founding members (Rinus Vreugdenhil, Laurens Bakker) to rejoin Picture together with Ronald van Prooijen in 2016 he readily agreed.

References

1958 births
Living people
Dutch rock guitarists
Lead guitarists
People from Spijkenisse
Dutch heavy metal guitarists
Dutch male guitarists